State Highway 12 ( RJ SH 12) is a State Highway in Rajasthan state of India that connects Sanganer in Jaipur district with Kankroli in Rajsamand district of Rajasthan. The total length of RJ SH 12 is 324.20 km.
It serves as a link from Kankroli, Rajasthan to Sanganer, Jaipur. The main city on this route is Kekri. It is an industrial road from Kekri to Sanganer, Rajasthan. There is only one toll station on this road out of Malpura.

References
 State Highway

 Transport in Ajmer district
 Bhilwara district
 Transport in Jaipur district
Rajsamand district
Tonk district
State Highways in Rajasthan